Splicing factor 3B subunit 1 is a protein that in humans is encoded by the SF3B1 gene.

Function 

This gene encodes subunit 1 of the splicing factor 3b protein complex. Splicing factor 3b, together with splicing factor 3a and a 12S RNA unit, forms the U2 small nuclear ribonucleoproteins complex (U2 snRNP). The splicing factor 3b/3a complex binds pre-mRNA upstream of the intron's branch site in a sequence independent manner and may anchor the U2 snRNP to the pre-mRNA. Splicing factor 3b is also a component of the minor U12-type spliceosome. The carboxy-terminal two-thirds of subunit 1 have 22 non-identical, tandem HEAT repeats that form rod-like, helical structures. Alternative splicing results in multiple transcript variants encoding different isoforms.

Interactions 

SF3B1 has been shown to interact with:
 CDC5L,
 DDX42,
 PPP1R8,
 SF3B2,
 SF3B3,
 SF3B14,

Clinical relevance 

Mutations in this gene have been recurrently seen in cases of advanced chronic lymphocytic leukemia, myelodysplastic syndromes and breast cancer. SF3B1 mutations are found in 60%-80% of patients with refractory anemia with ring sideroblasts (RARS; which is a myelodysplastic syndrome) or RARS with thrombocytosis (RARS-T; which is a myelodysplastic syndrome/myeloproliferative neoplasm). There is also an emerging body of evidence to suggest implications of SF3B1 mutations being involved in orbital melanoma.

References

Further reading